Tremblay (French pronunciation: [tʁɑ̃blɛ]) is a French Toponymic surname, especially common in French-speaking Canada, that may refer to:
Alfred Tremblay (1912-1975), Canadian prospector and explorer
Amaryllis Tremblay, Canadian actress
Amédée Tremblay (1876–1949), Canadian organist, composer, and music educator
Arthur Tremblay (1917–1996), Canadian politician
Benoît Tremblay (born 1948), Canadian politician
Charles Tremblay (1930–2002), American Nordic combined skier
Charles-Henri Tremblay, Canadian politician
Clarisse Tremblay (1951-1999), Canadian poet and writer
David Tremblay (born 1987), Canadian freestyle wrestler
Émilie Fortin Tremblay (1872–1949), Canadian explorer
Emma Tremblay (born 2004), Canadian actress
Erica Tremblay (born 1980), Seneca–Cayuga American documentary film director
Fannie Tremblay (1885-1970), stage name of Stéphanie Massey, Canadian performer
François Leclerc du Tremblay (1577–1638), French friar and agent
François-Louis Tremblay (born 1980), Canadian short track speed skater
Gaston Tremblay (1924–1998), Canadian politician
George Tremblay (1911–1982), Canadian-American pianist, composer, and author
Gérald Tremblay (born 1942), Canadian politician and businessman
Gerald R. Tremblay (born 1944), Canadian lawyer
Ghyslain Tremblay (1951-2020), Canadian actor and comedian
Gilles Tremblay (disambiguation), multiple people
J.C. Tremblay  (1939–1994), Canadian hockey player
Jacob Tremblay (born 2006), Canadian actor
Jacques Tremblay (disambiguation), multiple people
Jean Tremblay (born 1948), Canadian businessman and politician
Jean-Gaston Tremblay (1928-2011), Canadian religious leader
Jean-Noël Tremblay (1926–2020), Canadian politician
Johanne-Marie Tremblay (born 1950), Canadian actress
John Paul Tremblay (born 1968), Canadian actor 
Kay Tremblay (1914–2005), Canadian dancer
Karelle Tremblay (born 1996), Canadian film and television actress
Kathy Tremblay (born 1982), Canadian triathlete
Léonard Tremblay (1896–1968), Canadian politician
Lise Tremblay, (born 1957), Canadian writer
Lucie Blue Tremblay (born 1958), Canadian folk singer-songwriter
Marc Tremblay, engineer at Microsoft
Marcel Tremblay (disambiguation), multiple people
Mario Tremblay (born 1956), Canadian hockey player and coach
Mario Tremblay (aka MC Mario), Canadian disk jockey
Michel Tremblay (politician) (born 1933), Canadian politician
Michel Tremblay (born 1942), French Canadian novelist and playwright
Monique Gagnon-Tremblay (born 1940), Canadian politician
Paul G. Tremblay (born 1971), American author
Pamphile Réal Du Tremblay (1879–1955), Quebec lawyer, businessman and politician
Raymond D. Tremblay, Canadian writer
Ray Condo (born Ray Tremblay) (1950–2004), Canadian musician and painter
René Tremblay (1922–1968), Canadian politician
Richard E. Tremblay (born 1944), Canadian psychologist
Richard "Blaimert" Tremblay, Canadian television writer and producer
Richard-Max Tremblay(born 1952), Canadian artist and photographer
Roland Michel Tremblay (born 1972), Canadian author
Rodrigue Tremblay (born 1939), Canadian economist, humanist and political figure
Stéphan Tremblay (born 1973), Canadian politician
Stéfanie Tremblay (born 1990), Canadian judoka
Suzanne Tremblay (1937–2020), Canadian politician
Véronyque Tremblay (born 1974), Canadian journalist and politician
Yannick Tremblay (born 1975), Canadian ice hockey player
Yannick Tremblay (born 1977), Canadian ice hockey player

French-language surnames